Amand Lucas (born 18 December 1936, Liège) is a Belgian scientist and professor at the Facultés Universitaires Notre-Dame de la Paix, at the Institute for Studies in Interface Sciences. In 1985, he was awarded the Francqui Prize on Exact Sciences for his work on theoretical physics.

References

Belgian physicists
Walloon people
Living people
Academic staff of the Université de Namur
1936 births